Jean-Pierre Mangin (born 26 October 1937) is a French philatelist who specialized in finding error in the design of postage stamps. He wrote a bilingual world guide of Errors on stamps.

Mangin was a member of the French Académie de philatélie between 4 June 1994 and his voted eviction in December 2005. He was president of the European Academy of Philately for a 2000-2007 mandate, but resigned and was evicted there as well. The same happened at the Réal Academia Hispanica de Philatelia.

On 26 October 2007, he became a founding member of the Académie Mondiale de Philatélie, and became its first president.

In the 2000s, he wrote a monthly column in the French magazine L'Écho de la timbrologie about errors on stamps found by the readers.

Books 
 With René Geslin, Le Cycle et la Poste, 1988. About the importance of bicycle in the mail distribution in France and stamps of this thematic collection.

Notes and references 

French philatelists
1937 births
Living people